Strombiola is a genus of moths in the family Lecithoceridae. It contains the species Strombiola papuana, which is found in New Guinea.

References

Lecithocerinae
Monotypic moth genera